The following lists events from 2015 in Hong Kong.

Incumbents
 Chief Executive - Leung Chun-ying

Events

January
 14, 19 and 21 January - 6th Hong Kong International Chamber Music Festival
 19–22 January - HKTDC Hong Kong Fashion Week for fall and winter.

February
 1 February - Pro-democracy protesters peaceful return to the streets of Hong Kong for the first time since the end of Occupy Central protests in December.

April
 1 April - The Executive Council of Hong Kong announced that Asia Television's television licence will not be renewed, the first time this has happened. Meanwhile HK Television Entertainment is awarded a new television licence.

Deaths

May
 9 May - Lo Wing-lok, 60, Hong Kong politician, member of the Legislative Council for Medical (2000–2004), lung cancer. (b. 1954)
 16 May - Yeung Kwong, 89, Hong Kong pro-communist activist.

See also
 List of Hong Kong films of 2015

References

 
Years of the 21st century in Hong Kong
Hong Kong
Hong Kong